Marie Louise Hartman (born March 11, 1959), known professionally as Nina Hartley, is an American pornographic film actress and sex educator. She has been described by CNBC as "a legend in the adult world".

Early life and education
Hartley was born on March 11, 1959 in Berkeley, California, to a Lutheran father, Louis Hartman, and a Jewish mother, Blanche Hartman (née Gelders), whose family was from Alabama.
Her grandfather was a University of Alabama physics professor who was a Communist Party USA (CPUSA) party member in the 1930s.
Hartley's parents were members of the CPUSA who converted to Buddhism when she was young.
Her father was blacklisted in 1957 for his communist beliefs.

Hartley grew up in the San Francisco Bay Area, and as a teenager self-identified as a feminist.
After graduating from Berkeley High School in 1977, she attended San Francisco State University's undergraduate nursing school and graduated magna cum laude in 1985.
She was a registered nurse until her license expired in 1986.

Adult film career
As a young woman, Hartley sought out a career in pornography as a way to make a living by having sex.
She writes that part of her reason for choosing sex work was to be able to meet other bisexual women and indulge her exhibitionistic and voyeuristic streak.
She has said she chose her life's work when she saw the 1976 erotic film The Autobiography of a Flea alone at a theater in San Francisco.
In 1982, during her sophomore year of nursing school, she started working as a stripper at the Sutter Cinema and then the Mitchell Brothers O'Farrell Theatre.
She told an interviewer that she chose the name "Nina" because it was easy for Japanese tourists to say during the time she was a dancer in San Francisco, and "Hartley" because it was close to her own last name, and she "wanted a name that sounded like that of a real person."

Las Vegas Weekly has described Hartley as "a guiding force for a generation of feminist porn stars".
Describing herself as a "classical liberal feminist", Hartley has stated that "Pleasure is very, very powerful, very, very potent. You're no longer at the mercy of men when you understand that", and "Sex isn't something men do to you. It isn't something men get out of you. Sex is something you dive into with gusto and like it every bit as much as he does."
In 2013 she described her father's reaction upon learning about her occupation:

Her pornographic film debut was in Educating Nina (1984), where she was cast and directed by fellow performer Juliet Anderson.
In the 1980s and early 1990s, she starred in several of the Debbie Does Dallas film series spin-offs such as Debbie Duz Dishes (1986) and Debbie Does Wall Street (1991).
In 1992, she directed her first movie, Nina Hartley's Book of Love.
For many years, she toured the United States and Canada as a stripper and made personal appearances at sex shops.
Hartley also produced and starred in a series of sex education videos for Adam & Eve.
In 1994, she began her line of instructional videos marketed under the Nina Hartley's Guide brand.
Hartley played the part of Hillary Clinton in the 2008 satirical pornographic film Who's Nailin' Paylin?, with Lisa Ann in the role of Sarah Palin.
 Hartley was still actively performing, and by 2017 she had appeared in more than one thousand pornographic films.
She has been described by news outlets as "one of the best-known actresses in the industry" and "a legend in the adult world".

Mainstream media appearances
Hartley acted in the 1996 Canadian film Bubbles Galore and has appeared on The Oprah Winfrey Show.
In the 1997 film Boogie Nights, she played William H. Macy's character's serially unfaithful wife who is murdered.
She later remarked, "The only movie I ever died in for having sex was a mainstream movie."  She also played Wanda, a salesclerk at a sex toy shop, in the 2017 punk comedy film Scumbag.

Hartley has appeared in several documentary films: she was interviewed in The Naked Feminist (2003) was featured in After Porn Ends (2012), and appears in Sticky: A (Self) Love Story (2016), in which she discusses masturbation with regards to education, the forced resignation of Joycelyn Elders, and her opinions on the blackballing of comedian Paul Reubens after his arrest for masturbating in a public theater.

Activism
Hartley has been described as an "outspoken feminist, sex educator and advocate for sexual freedom".
She began engaging in feminist activism in the 1980s and has made frequent appearances at academic conferences, workshops, and in the media to promote sex positivity.
She has given lectures at Dartmouth College, Harvard University, and the University of California.

Hartley is a long-time board member of the Woodhull Freedom Foundation,
and was elected to the board of the Free Speech Coalition in 1995.
She has been involved in socialist activism
and has long been affiliated with the Adult Performer Advocacy Committee (APAC), a labor union for pornographic film actors.

Writing
In 2006, Hartley co-authored Nina Hartley's Guide to Total Sex with her husband Ira Levine. The book includes sections on sex toys, swinging, threesomes, dominance and submission, and erotic spanking.
Library Journal called the book a "well-written guide" that is "strong on both safe sex and a permissive approach", saying Hartley "handles the material frankly, accurately, and with sensitivity".

Publications
 "Reflections of a Feminist Porn Star" (1993). In 
  (1994). In 
  (1997). In 
 With 
 With 
 "Porn: An Effective Vehicle for Sexual Role Modeling and Education" (2013). In

Personal life
Hartley is a self-described bisexual, swinger, and exhibitionist.
For two decades until the early 2000s, she was involved in a three-way relationship with her first husbanda former Students for a Democratic Society leaderand a woman.
She married her male partner in 1986; their divorce was finalized in 2003.
The same year, Hartley married Ira Levine, a director of porn films under the name Ernest Greene.
They are openly polyamorous.

Politically, Hartley describes herself as a democratic socialist, saying, "There are some things the federal government is essential for and some things best left to local government."

Awards

AVN Awards
Hartley has received eight Adult Video News Awards, including:

XRCO Awards
Hartley has won a number of XRCO Awards:

Other awards and nominations

References

Further reading
  Features a chapter on Hartley
 
  Features an essay and introduction by Hartley
  Features a chapter on Hartley
 
 
 
  Features an interview with Hartley

External links

 

1959 births
20th-century American actresses
21st-century American actresses
Actresses from Berkeley, California
American erotic dancers
American female erotic dancers
American pornographic film directors
American nurses
American women nurses
Jewish American actresses
American pornographic film actresses
American sex educators
American women film directors
Berkeley High School (Berkeley, California) alumni
Bisexual pornographic film actresses
LGBT film directors
LGBT Jews
LGBT people from California
Living people
Pornographic film actors from California
San Francisco State University alumni
Sex-positive feminists
Sex worker activists in the United States
Women pornographic film directors
Polyamorous people
American democratic socialists
American feminist writers
American bisexual writers